WSRN-FM (91.5 FM, The "Worldwide Swarthmore Radio Network") is Swarthmore College's official campus radio station. It broadcasts out of the suburban Philadelphia borough of Swarthmore, Pennsylvania.

Prior to the 1970s, WSRN operated as a carrier signal broadcast to the campus of Swarthmore College only. The station went on the air with 10 watts on October 15, 1972. Following efforts by the Federal Communications Commission (FCC) to encourage as many Class D stations as possible to increase power, a campaign was raised by the students of the college, and in the late 1970s, the FCC granted a license for a 110-watt, directional, transmission.

Programming has been eclectic from the 1970s on.  Station programming is diverse; music spans "world," hip hop, blues, folk, rock, pop, R & B, and classical. Talk and comedy programs comprise much of the weekend line-up. Notably "Funk" which ran from fall 2012 to spring 2014 Friday mornings from midnight to 2AM.

In 1986, the main on-air studio was completely refurbished, with a new control panel, turntables, microphones, and wiring installed.  1998 saw the rewiring and modernization of the production studio and the construction of an acoustically isolated sound studio connected to the production studio.

Students have always manned the soundboard, and so, during most summers, the station is dark.

Following the COVID-19 pandemic, the radio station had periods of limited broadcasting.  During the 2021-2022 academic year, a significant effort by students, faculty, staff, and community members was successfully carried out to get the station back up to an operational state.  As of April 1, 2022, the station has resumed broadcasting.

References

External links
WSRN 91.5 official website

SRN
SRN
Swarthmore College